Bovingdon is a village in England.

Bovingdon may also refer to:

 RAF Bovingdon, Royal Air Force military base, England
 John Bovingdon (1890–1973), modern dancer and economic analyst, USA

See also 
 Bovingdon Green (disambiguation), England
 Bovingdon Hall Woods, biological area, England
 Bovingdon stack, airspace, England
 Bovington (disambiguation)
 Boyington